Apistobranchidae is a family of polychaetes belonging to the order Spionida.

References

Canalipalpata
Annelid families